Maruf Hossain Ibn Saeed (Popularly known: Samurai Maruf or Maruf Samurai) is a Bangladeshi art director. He won Bangladesh National Film Award for Best Art Direction two times for the films Taarkata (2014) and Zero Degree (2015).

Selected films
 The Guest - 2013
 Taarkata - 2014
 Zero Degree - 2015
 Samraat - 2016
 Debi - 2018

Awards and nominations
National Film Awards

References

External links
 

Best Art Direction National Film Award (Bangladesh) winners
Bangladeshi art directors
Year of birth missing (living people)
Living people